The Denton Arts & Jazz Festival is a free 2½-day event held the last weekend of every April in the city of Denton, Texas, and was established in 1981. Produced by the Denton Festival Foundation and sponsored by the City of Denton and corporate sponsors, it brings over 200,000 people each year for live music, fine art, food, drink, crafts, and recreation. The festival is held in Quakertown Park (formerly Civic Center Park), a natural space in the heart of the city near the town square. The festival includes seven stages, 2,300 artists and 250+ arts and crafts booths. Nationally recognized musicians  such as Ravi Coltrane, Jack DeJohnette, and Aaron Neville headline the festival every year on the main stage. The Showcase Stage draws large crowds, with big bands, vocal ensembles, and student jazz groups from the University of North Texas College of Music.

2020 saw the COVID-19 pandemic causing officials to scrap the festival. The 40th was deferred to 2021.

See also
 Thin Line Fest
 35 Denton

External links
Denton Arts & Jazz Fest – Official Website

Jazz festivals in the United States
Music festivals in Texas
Festivals in Denton, Texas
Annual events in Texas